Amiota is a genus of flies belonging to the family Drosophilidae. The genus has a cosmopolitan distribution.

Species
Amiota aculeata Chen & Aotsuka, 2005
Amiota acuta Okada, 1968
Amiota ailaoshanensis Chen & Watabe, 2005
Amiota albidipuncta Xu & Chen, 2007
Amiota albilabris (Roth, 1860)
Amiota alboguttata (Wahlberg, 1839)
Amiota albomaculata (Duda, 1926)
Amiota allemandi Bächli, Vilela & Haring, 2002
Amiota angulisternita Chen & Liu, 2004
Amiota angustifolia Zhang & Chen, 2006
Amiota apodemata Gupta & Panigrahy, 1987
Amiota aquilotaurusata Takada, Beppu & Toda, 1979
Amiota arcuata Chen & Watabe, 2005
Amiota aristata Chen & Toda, 2001
Amiota arizonensis Hsu, 1949
Amiota asymmetrica Chen & Takamori, 2005
Amiota atomia Máca & Lin, 1993
Amiota bachlii Cao & Chen, 2009
Amiota bacillia Zhang & Chen, 2006
Amiota balaenodentata Takada, Beppu & Toda, 1979
Amiota bandai Chassagnard & Tsacas, 1997
Amiota barretti (Johnson, 1921)
Amiota basdeni Assis Fonseca, 1965
Amiota beama Wang & Chen, 2020
Amiota biacuta Zhang & Chen, 2006
Amiota bicolorata Bock, 1989
Amiota bifoliacea Wang & Chen, 2020
Amiota bifoliolata Zhang & Chen, 2006
Amiota bifurcata Chen, 2004
Amiota bispinula Chen & Toda, 2007
Amiota brevifoliacea Wang & Chen, 2020
Amiota brevipartita Chen & Gao, 2005
Amiota brunneifemoralis Xu & Chen, 2007
Amiota buccata Wheeler, 1952
Amiota cerata Chen & Toda, 2007
Amiota chenyauae Cao & Chen, 2009
Amiota clavata Okada, 1960
Amiota collini Beuk & Máca, 1995
Amiota communis Chen & Steyskal, 2004
Amiota cuii Chen & Toda, 2001
Amiota cultella Zhang & Chen, 2006
Amiota curvibacula Chen & Toda, 2007
Amiota curvispina Chen & Gao, 2005
Amiota curvistyla Okada, 1971
Amiota cyclophylla Wang & Chen, 2020
Amiota dehiscentia Chen & Watabe, 2005
Amiota delta Takada, Beppu & Toda, 1979
Amiota deltoidea Zhang & Chen, 2006
Amiota dentata Okada, 1971
Amiota dilatifemorata Cao & Chen, 2008
Amiota dispina Okada, 1960
Amiota elongata Okada, 1960
Amiota eos Sidorenko, 1989
Amiota falcilis Takada, Beppu & Toda, 1979
Amiota femorata Chen & Takamori, 2005
Amiota filipes Máca, 1980
Amiota fissifoliolata Cao & Chen, 2008
Amiota flagellata Okada, 1971
Amiota flavipes Xu & Chen, 2007
Amiota flavopruinosa Duda, 1934
Amiota flavopruniosa Duda, 1934
Amiota flormontana Wang & Chen, 2020
Amiota forficula Takada, Beppu & Toda, 1979
Amiota furcata Okada, 1960
Amiota fuscata Chen & Zhang, 2005
Amiota gaoi Zhang & Chen, 2006
Amiota geisson Wang & Chen, 2020
Amiota gigantomelania Wang & Chen, 2020
Amiota gracilenta Zhang & Chen, 2006
Amiota hernowoi Chen & Toda, 1998
Amiota hsui Máca, 2003
Amiota huae Chen & Gao, 2005
Amiota humeralis Loew, 1862
Amiota javaensis Chen & Toda, 1998
Amiota jianjuni Wang & Chen, 2020
Amiota jizushanensis Chen & Watabe, 2005
Amiota kamui Chen & Toda, 2001
Amiota kimurai Chen & Toda, 2001
Amiota kingstoni Hsu, 1949
Amiota kitamurai Chen & Liu, 2004
Amiota lacteoguttata (Portschinsky, 1891)
Amiota lambirensis Chen & Toda, 2007
Amiota lanceolata Okada, 1971
Amiota latitabula Chen & Watabe, 2005
Amiota leucostoma Loew, 1862
Amiota lineiventris Máca, 2003
Amiota lipingae Chen & Gao, 2005
Amiota longispinata Chen & Gao, 2005
Amiota luguhuensis Chen & Watabe, 2005
Amiota macai Chen & Toda, 2001
Amiota magniflava Chen & Toda, 2001
Amiota mariae Máca, 2003
Amiota medidehiscentia Wang & Chen, 2020
Amiota melanoleuca Tsacas, 1990
Amiota minor (Malloch, 1921)
Amiota montuosa Zhang & Chen, 2008
Amiota multiprocessa Wang & Chen, 2020
Amiota multispinata Zhang & Chen, 2006
Amiota nagatai Okada, 1960
Amiota nebojsa Máca, 2003
Amiota nigrescens Wheeler, 1952
Amiota nigripes Wang & Chen, 2020
Amiota nozawai Chen & Watabe, 2005
Amiota nuerhachii Chen & Toda, 2001
Amiota nulliseta Wang & Chen, 2020
Amiota obtusa Wang & Chen, 2020
Amiota okinawana Okada, 1971
Amiota onchopyga Nishiharu, 1979
Amiota orchidea Okada, 1968
Amiota palpifera Okada, 1971
Amiota paraspinata Chen & Watabe, 2005
Amiota parvipyga Chen & Toda, 1998
Amiota parviserrata Chen & Toda, 2007
Amiota pengi Chen & Toda, 1998
Amiota perpusilla (Walker, 1849)
Amiota phyllochaeta Tsacas & Okada, 1983
Amiota pianmensis Zhang & Chen, 2006
Amiota planata Chen & Toda, 2001
Amiota planiceps Wang & Chen, 2020
Amiota policladia Wang & Chen, 2020
Amiota pontianakensis Chen & Toda, 1998
Amiota promissa Okada, 1960
Amiota protuberantis Cao & Chen, 2009:
Amiota quadrifoliolata Chen & Toda, 2007
Amiota ratnae Chen & Toda, 1998
Amiota rufescens (Oldenberg, 1914)
Amiota sacculipes Máca & Lin, 1993
Amiota scrobiculus Wang & Chen, 2020
Amiota semiannuiata Wang & Chen, 2020
Amiota setigera Malloch, 1924
Amiota setitibia Xu & Chen, 2007
Amiota setosa Zhang & Chen, 2006
Amiota shangrila Chen & Watabe, 2005
Amiota sigma Okada, 1971
Amiota sinuata Okada, 1968
Amiota spinata Chen & Toda, 2001
Amiota spinifemorata Li & Chen, 2008
Amiota steganoptera Malloch, 1926
Amiota steyskali Máca, 2003
Amiota stylopyga Wakahama & Okada, 1958
Amiota subfurcata Okada, 1971
Amiota subsinuata Chen & Aotsuka, 2005
Amiota subtursradiata Duda, 1934
Amiota subtusradiata Duda, 1934
Amiota taurusata Takada, Beppu & Toda, 1979
Amiota tentacula Wang & Chen, 2020
Amiota todai Sidorenko, 1989
Amiota trifurcata Okada, 1968
Amiota uncinata Wang & Chen, 2020
Amiota vulnerabla Chen & Zhang, 2004
Amiota wangi Chen & Zhang, 2005
Amiota watabei Chen & Toda, 2001
Amiota wuyishanensis Chen & Zhang, 2005
Amiota xinglaii Wang & Chen, 2020
Amiota xishuangbanna Chen & Aotsuka, 2005
Amiota yangonensis Chen & Toda, 1998
Amiota yifengi Zhang & Chen, 2006
Amiota yixiangna Chen & Takamori, 2005

References

Drosophilidae